Inese Geca-Miljone (born March 3, 1978) is a Latvian ice hockey player, currently playing with SHK Laima Rīga. Geca-Miljone represented Latvian national team in fourteen IIHF Women's World Championships at the Division IA and IB levels. In 2017 she represented Latvian national team as an assistant coach.

Geca-Miljone and her daughter, Līga Miljone, made history as the first mother-daughter duo to play in the same IIHF World Women's Championship, first appearing together at the 2013 Division IA tournament, and again in 2014 and 2016. At the 2017 IIHF Women's World Championship they represented Latvia as coach and player.

International play

Inese Geca-Miljone played her first International game in 1992 against Ukraine, which was the first ever game for Latvian national team at the 2013 IIHF Women's World Championship Division I. Inese Geca-Miljone and Latvian national team debuted in the 1999 Women's World Ice Hockey Championships (Lower Divisions) in Colmar, France and earned 5th place. Geca-Miljone posted 10 points (7+3) in her first IIHF tournament.

Coaching career

Geca-Miljone was an assistant coach for Latvian national team in OGQ in 2016, and in 2017 IIHF Women's World Championship Division I. Latvian national team finished the IIHF 2017 tournament in third place and was recognized with bronze medals.

Career statistics

International

References

External links
 

Living people
1978 births
Ice hockey people from Riga
Latvian women's ice hockey players
Latvian ice hockey left wingers